Zhang Shuai (Chinese: 张帅; born 15 January 1993) is a Chinese footballer who currently plays for Zibo Cuju.

Club career
In 2012, Zhang Shuai started his professional footballer career with Henan Jianye in the Chinese Super League. On 18 July 2012, he made his senior debut in a 2–1 away defeat against Guangzhou Evergrande in the 2012 Chinese FA Cup, coming on as a substitute for Yuan Ye in the 65th minute. On 26 October 2014, he made his Super League debut against Hangzhou Greentown, coming on for Zhu Yifan in the 60th minute. He scored his first senior goal on 28 June 2016 in a 6–1 win over Yunnan Lijiang in the 2016 Chinese FA Cup. Despite this achievement he struggled to gain regular playing time and was dropped to the reserve team in the 2017 league season. 

Zhang joined China League One side Shijiazhuang Ever Bright in June 2017 on a free transfer and was initially placed in the reserve squad. He was promoted to the first team squad in the summer of 2018. On 11 July 2018, he made his debut as a converted centre-back and scored his first goal for the club in a 3–3 home draw against Qingdao Huanghai.

Career statistics
Statistics accurate as of match played 31 December 2020.

References

External links
 

1993 births
Living people
Chinese footballers
People from Kaifeng
Footballers from Henan
Henan Songshan Longmen F.C. players
Cangzhou Mighty Lions F.C. players
Beijing Sport University F.C. players
Chinese Super League players
China League One players
Association football forwards